Ocellated frog may refer to:

 Ocellated bubble-nest frog (Liuixalus ocellatus), a frog in the family Rhacophoridae endemic to Hainan Island, China
 Ocellated spiny frog (Nanorana feae), a frog in the family Dicroglossidae found in Yunnan, China, and Kachin Hills in Myanmar

See also

 Ocellated treefrog (disambiguation)

Animal common name disambiguation pages